Cobblestone Jazz is a Canadian trio based in Victoria, British Columbia, known for their jazz improvisation-influenced approach to making electronic music. The band has been described as "a 21st century jam band, a 'Plastikman-meets-the-Grateful Dead' juggernaut." The band consists of Mathew Jonson, Danuel Tate, and Tyger Dhula. Together with regular collaborator The Mole (Colin de la Plante), the group has also performed as The Modern Deep Left Quartet.

History

The members of Cobblestone Jazz had been jamming and performing together since about 1996. The band was founded in 2002 and began playing electronic jazz music in Victoria. They later did some touring, including a set at Mutek 2003 in Montreal and performance in Madrid, Spain. They recorded some tracks, including "Dumptruck" and “India In Me”, in 2006.

In 2007 the group released a double album, 23 Seconds, through the German label !K7, featuring a studio and a live disc.

In 2008 the band toured in the United States, and in 2009 the trio was joined by a fourth musician, Colin de la Plante, and performed at festivals as The Modern Deep Left Quartet. In 2010 this lineup released an album with leanings more toward electronic music influences than jazz. Reviews were fairly positive.

In 2015 the band performed in Japan and released an EP, Northern Lights.

The group played at the Houghton Festival in the UK in 2017. They performed at the Caprices Festival in 2018. As of 2021, they were slated to appear at the 2022 NEOPOP Electronic Music Festival but they no longer have a website.

Discography

Albums

Extended plays

References

External links 

Canadian techno music groups